The Paramotor Mosquito is a Polish paramotor that was designed by Ryszrd Zygadio and produced by Paramotor Napedy Paralotniowe of Warsaw for powered paragliding. Now out of production, when it was available the aircraft was supplied complete and ready-to-fly.

Design and development
The Mosquito was designed to comply with the US FAR 103 Ultralight Vehicles rules as well as European regulations. It features a paraglider-style wing, single-place accommodation and a single engine in pusher configuration with a reduction drive and a  diameter two-bladed composite propeller, all depending on the model. The aircraft is built from a combination of  aluminium, with a stainless steel tube propeller cage.

As is the case with all paramotors, take-off and landing is accomplished by foot. Inflight steering is accomplished via handles that actuate the canopy brakes, creating roll and yaw.

Variants
Mosquito M21Y
Model with a  Cors'Air M21Y engine in pusher configuration with a 2.5:1 ratio reduction drive and a  diameter two-bladed composite propeller.
Mosquito 120
Model with a  Radne Raket 120 engine in pusher configuration with a 3.6:1 ratio reduction drive and a  diameter two-bladed composite propeller.
Mosquito Radne 100
Model with a  Radne Raket 120 engine in pusher configuration with a 3.6:1 ratio reduction drive and a  diameter two-bladed composite propeller.
Mosquito Top
Model with a  Per Il Volo Top 80 engine in pusher configuration with a 4:1 ratio reduction drive and a  diameter two-bladed composite propeller.

Specifications (Mosquito Top)

References

External links

Mosquito
2000s Polish ultralight aircraft
Single-engined pusher aircraft
Paramotors